María Margarita Muñoz Parra (September 18, 1987 in Pitalito, Huila, Colombia) is a Colombian model and actress who has participated in soap operas for television networks like Caracol TV, RCN, TV Azteca, Televisa and Telemundo. She is ranked as one of the most beautiful young actresses and international revelations. She has been chosen several times by the magazine TV y Novelas publishing group Televisa as one of the most beautiful famous of Colombian television.

Biography 
She lived in her farm in Pitalito, in this city she studied primary in the School of Presentation and part of her secondary education at the Liceo Andaki. Her dream of becoming a Colombian television made from 13 years for the city of Bogotá. She studied at the school of Julio César Luna.

Personal life 
On February 23, 2013 she married the Argentine actor Michel Brown in the Archipelago of San Bernardo, Cartagena, Colombia.

Career 
She began her career in television commercial recording, her manager is John Ceballos. She quickly joined the 2004 at age 16 the cast of the soap opera Caracol TV, El auténtico Rodrigo Leal where she played Valentina Manzur, a naughty little girl who wants attention regardless the consequences, demonstrating its sensuality and leaving a sigh in more than a man. In this production is interfered between the protagonists, Rodrigo and Carmen, played by Martin Karpans and Carolina Gómez papers, and holds an affair with Cesar, the character actor Juan Pablo Llano.

In 2005 popularity rose enough to join the cast as a young protagonist of the successful novel RCN, Los Reyes, which plays Pilar Valenzuela, better known as The Pilarica or The Goddess Crowned, a studious and serious young woman of high social class that is committed to Santiago Iriarte (Daniel Arenas) who is her boyfriend and belongs to a recognized millionaire family, but ends in love with Leo Reyes (Julián Román) simple mechanical neighbor. This year was chosen for the first time among the most beautiful in the Colombian Television magazine TV y Novelas publishing group Televisa.

On 1 October 2007 tore the recordings of the new Co-Production channel RCN Television and Televisa called The Clan of the Deceived in which Margarita was the protagonist, the recordings were made in the city of Miami and among the cast also included the Peruvian actresses Maricielo Effio and Alexandra Grana. This novel was released simultaneously in the United States, Mexico and Colombia, thus leading to Margarita international recognition.

In 2009 was the villain of the soap opera Niños ricos, pobres padres of RTI Colombia to Telemundo where Margarita Dominguez played Isabella, a wealthy 17-year-old maintains a bad temper and always likes to demonstrate her power. This was the first production of Margarita in Singapore, which the consolidated internationally and in which it was shown that its role quite like. She worked with players of great experience like Fabiola Campomanes, Aylin Mujica, Didier van der Hove, Gabriel Valenzuela among others; and the new talents of Colombian television, Carmen Villalobos, Juan Sebastian Caicedo, Margarita Vega and Javier Jattin.

In 2010 starred in the production of Caracol TV, Secretos de familia which represents Victoria "Vicky" San Miguel, a college of comfortable life that keeps a stormy romance with a semantic teacher, older and married, and into her life comes Martin, a handsome and sexy man with whom she falls in love. From that moment she will live a difficult situation to decide whether to stay with a man who mistreats her or choose the path of happiness with the man she loves. She shared credits with actresses and very known actors in Colombia as Raquel Ercole, Germán Patiño, Luciano D'Alessandro and Marcela Carvajal.

In 2011 she acted in the production of Telemundo, the telenovela Los Herederos del Monte as Julieta Millan, the antagonist, compulsive and vain woman hiding a vengeful personality of hatred and resentment . Share set with successful international actors Ezequiel Montalt, Marlene Favela, Mario Cimarro, Diana Quijano, Jose Luis Resendez, among others.

In the 2013 was the star of the Mexican version of Gossip Girl, Gossip Girl Acapulco of Warner Brothers, The Mall and Televisa where she plays Vanessa Garcia, a beautiful, simple working girl who returns to the port of Acapulco with the motive to recover the boy she loves but this has to be entangled in a social world where the rich kids enjoy the luxuries, the loves and pleasures; and must now survive the embarrassing scandals that are revealed by a discrete girl with secret identity that calls Gossip Girl. She shared credits with young actors Vadhir Derbez, Jon Ecker, Sofia Sisniega, Diego Amozurrutia and Macarena Achaga. Her participation in this successful series made her award winner Palma de Oro for best actress in a leading role revelation given by the National Circle of Journalists AC in Mexico.

In 2014 was the villain of the soap opera Amor sin Reserva of Cadenatres where she played Renata. In this she worked with her husband Michel Brown who was the protagonist.

In 2015 she was the villain of the soap opera Dueños del paraíso of Telemundo, where she played Gina Bianchi. In this she worked with the famous Mexican star Kate del Castillo, who was the protagonist.

In 2017, she was the protagonist of two different novels in two different countries: Venganza of RCN Televisión in her home country, Colombia and Nada personal of TV Azteca in Mexico. In the first (which is a remake of the famous American series Revenge), she played Amanda Santana/Emilia Rivera (in the original series her role was played by Emily VanCamp and whose name in the original was Amanda Clarke-Porter/Emily Thorne). In the second (which is an adaptation of the original 1996 version, also from TV Azteca), she played Mariana Aragón (in the original version, the character was called Camila de los Reyes and was played by two different actresses, Ana Colchero and Christianne Gout).

Filmography

References

External links 
Piers Calvert Photography

1987 births
Colombian female models
Colombian telenovela actresses
Living people
People from Huila Department